John Hepburn (died after 20 July 1525) was a Scottish cleric. The son of Patrick Hepburn, 1st Lord of Hailes, he was Prior of Saint Andrews. He established St. Leonard's College at the University of St. Andrews in 1512. In around 1520 he funded the reconstruction of the town walls of St. Andrews.

He also served as tutor to Patrick Hepburn, 3rd Earl of Bothwell who succeeded him in the priory in 1522.

He was elected as Archbishop of St. Andrews but his appointment was turned down by the Pope.

References

The Scots Peerage by Sir James Balfour Paul, Edinburgh, 1905, 'Bothwell' p. 141/2.

15th-century births
1525 deaths
Archbishops of St Andrews
Canonical Augustinian abbots and priors
People from East Lothian
People associated with the University of St Andrews
Priors of St Andrews
16th-century Roman Catholic archbishops in Scotland